Sabina Abdullayeva (born May 30, 1996) – Azerbaijani paralympic judoka in the under-57 kilograms weight category and B2 classification for blindness, is the vice World Champion 2014 and silver medalist of the European championships 2015 and the 2015 European Games in Baku. For great achievements in the first European Games and services in the development of sports in Azerbaijan Sabina Abdullaeva was awarded the medal of "Progress". Representing Azerbaijan at the 2016 Summer Paralympics in Rio de Janeiro.

References
 

1996 births
Living people
Azerbaijani female judoka
Paralympic judoka of Azerbaijan
Judoka at the 2016 Summer Paralympics
Judoka at the 2015 European Games
European Games medalists in judo
European Games silver medalists for Azerbaijan
People from Sumgait
21st-century Azerbaijani women